L'horloger de la comète, written by Tome and drawn by Janry, is the thirty-sixth album of the Spirou et Fantasio series, and the fourth of the authors. The story was initially serialised in Spirou magazine, before released as a hardcover album in 1985.

Story

In The Comet's Watchmaker, The Count de Champignac goes to visit his great nephew and entrusts the castle to Spirou and Fantasio, who both hope to relax. However, a strange vessel crashes in their garden and an individual resembling the Count de Champignac, accompanied by a strange creature, Snouffelaire, disembark. The individual proves to be the descendant of the Count, Aurélien, come from the future to look for the seeds of some plants that are extinct in his time in order to preserve them, located in the forest of Palombia.

Knowing about the hostile environment of the Palombian jungle, Spirou proposes that he and Fantasio accompany Aurélien. However a malfunction sends the vessel to the sixteenth century during the Portuguese colonization of Palombie. Spirou, Fantasio and Aurélien are confronted by the hostile cannibals and the colonists who take them for French spies. Finally, Aurélien's vessel disintegrates, but strange individuals come from even further in the future to save them and to bring them back to their respective times.

References

 Tome publications in Spirou and Janry publications in Spirou BDoubliées

External links
Official site Spirou albums 

Spirou et Fantasio albums
Works originally published in Spirou (magazine)
Literature first published in serial form
1985 books
1985 in comics
Comics set in South America
Comics set in a fictional country